A Toast for Manolete (Spanish:Brindis a Manolete) is a 1948 Spanish drama film directed by Florián Rey and starring Paquita Rico, Pedro Ortega and Manolo Morán. The film is a biopic of the celebrated Spanish bullfighter Manolete, who had been killed the previous year.

Cast
 Paquita Rico as Dolores  
 Pedro Ortega as Manuel Rodríguez 'Manolete' 
 Manolo Morán as Antonio  
 Ana Adamuz as Doña Rosario  
 Manuel Monroy as Javier del Álamo  
 Eulália del Pino as Soledad 
 José Jaspe as Bronquista en bar  
 Mercedes Castellanos as Mercedes  
 Domingo Rivas as Gabriel  
 Juana Mansó as Remedios 
 Manolo Iglesias as Juan  
 Emilio Ruiz de Córdoba as Médico 
 José Greco as Rafael 
 Rafael Romero as Cantaor 
 Rafael Bardem as Hombre que da mala noticia  
 Trío Escudero as Trío flamenco 
 Fernanda 'La Cordobesita' as Bailaora 
 Porreto
 Manzanilla
 Orozco
 Manolo Badajoz
 Sevillano
 Joaquina Martí
 Luis Maravilla

References

Bibliography
 Bentley, Bernard. A Companion to Spanish Cinema. Boydell & Brewer 2008.

External links 

1948 films
1948 drama films
1940s biographical drama films
Films set in Spain
Spanish biographical drama films
1940s Spanish-language films
Films directed by Florián Rey
Spanish black-and-white films
1940s Spanish films